Heather Graham (born 1970) is an American actress.

Heather Graham may refer to:
 Heather Graham (cricketer) (born 1996), Australian cricketer
 Heather Graham Pozzessere (born 1953), American romance novelist
 Heather Heggestad (previously Heather Graham), Canadian curler